Will Gadd (born March 8, 1967) is a prominent Canadian ice climber and paraglider pilot.  He formerly held the paragliding world distance record, with a flight of 423 km in Zapata, Texas.  He is the host of the documentary series Fearless Planet, working with regional scientists and traveling with them, or by himself, to various locations that are in the individual episode's focus.

Ascent of Niagara Falls
In January 2015, Gadd became the first reported person to scale the ice-covered rock wall next to the Horseshoe Falls at Niagara Falls. He was followed by Canadian climber Sarah Hueniken. Their ascent took place on Goat Island, located on the American side of the falls. "I was so close to the water", Gadd stated, "I could reach out and stick my ice tool in the Niagara Falls".

See also
List of climbers

References

External links

Living people
Canadian mountain climbers
Sportspeople from Alberta
Paraglider pilots
1967 births
Ice climbers